Pedro Gual may refer to:

Places
Venezuela
 Pedro Gual, Venezuela, a municipality in the state of Miranda

People
 Pedro Gual Escandón, President of Venezuela